Jessica Gil Ortiz (born 7 December 1990) is a Colombian artistic gymnast and part of the national team.

She was injured in a floor exercise in London in 2009. She participated at the 2012 Summer Olympics in London, United Kingdom.

References

External links
Sports Reference
BBC
Reuters
The Guardian
totalprosports
city-physio.ner
professionalgymnastics.com
gymnasticscoaching.com
zimbio.com

1990 births
Living people
Colombian female artistic gymnasts
Gymnasts at the 2012 Summer Olympics
Olympic gymnasts of Colombia
Place of birth missing (living people)
Gymnasts at the 2007 Pan American Games
Gymnasts at the 2011 Pan American Games
South American Games bronze medalists for Colombia
South American Games medalists in gymnastics
Competitors at the 2006 South American Games
Pan American Games competitors for Colombia
21st-century Colombian women